Carl Sumner Shoup (October 26, 1902 – March 23, 2000) was an American economist and public finance expert. He is best known for leading the Shoup Mission of 1949-1950, tasked with revising the fiscal system of post-World War II Japan. He directly contributed to the tax codes of Canada, the United States, Japan, Europe, and South and Central America in the 1930s, '40s, and '50s. He retired as professor emeritus at Columbia University.

Family
Carl Shoup was the son of railroad executive Paul Shoup and Rose Wilson Shoup.  He and his wife Ruth had three children: Dale Shoup Mayer (1925–2019), Donald Sumner Shoup (1934–1989), and Paul Snedden Shoup. Ruth died in 1998, two years before her husband.

Born in San Jose, and grew up in Los Altos riding his horse to school.

Government economic and tax policy
Co-directed, with fellow economist Roy Blough, the creation of the 1937 six-volume study "Report on the Federal Revenue System" of American taxes and potential reforms at the request of Treasury Secretary Henry Morgenthau Jr.

Carl Shoup has been identified as an intellectual father of the value-added tax (VAT). In particular, Shoup developed a taxonomy for describing the value added taxes and linking the administration of the VAT to the capabilities of the particular country.

In 1949-1950, during post-World War II fiscal reconstruction, Shoup led the Shoup Mission, a team of seven economists appointed by General MacArthur to revise the Japanese fiscal system. The resulting tax codes remain in use today.

In the 1950s, Shoup contributed to the overhaul of the tax systems in Venezuela, Cuba, and Liberia, and participated in the creation of the value-added tax systems in Canada and Europe.

Authorship
 Public Taxation: April 1969 by Intervale Publishing Company 
 Ricardo on Taxation: September 1992 by Ashgate Publishing, Ltd

Honors
 Shoup was awarded the Order of the Sacred Treasure twice by Japan’s Emperor Hirohito.  The order of the sacred treasure is an award from the country of Japan for long and meritorious service.
 McVicknar Professor Emeritus of Political Economy
 Columbia University Professorship in Honoring Carl Sumner Shoup Endowed by Toyota Motor Company
 Distinguished fellow of the American Economic Association

References 

20th-century American economists
Columbia University faculty
Columbia University alumni
2000 deaths
1902 births
Distinguished Fellows of the American Economic Association